Vilnius City Innovation Industrial Park (VCIIP) is an industrial park located in Vilnius, Lithuania. The park is 24 ha with a developed infrastructure.  In 2015, VCIIP was granted the status of a national importance economic project.

Companies 
The Park is for companies operating in the smart specialization priority areas. Companies include Poliprojektas, Experimentica, Sanobiotec, Biotecha
From 2022 majority of members of the Life Sciences Digital Innovation Hub cluster will establish in the life sciences incubator at the VCIIP territory.

Transport 
The Park is about 30 minutes from Vilnius international airport.
Public transport is available.

References

External links 
Vilnius City Innovation Industrial Park official website

Economy of Lithuania
Vilnius District Municipality